Harald Kaarma (12 December 1901 – 19 August 1942) was an Estonian footballer.

Career
Kaarma earned 17 caps for the Estonian national team between 1921 and 1926. He spent the majority of his career playing for JK Tallinna Kalev and participated at the 1924 Summer Olympics.

He became an Estonian champion in 1923 with JK Tallinna Kalev and in 1926 with Tallinna JK. 

Following the annexation of Estonia by the Soviet Union, he was arrested by the Soviet authorities in the summer of 1941 because of his occupation as an Estonian state policeman and was deported to a labor camp in Sverdlovsk Oblast. Kaarma was executed a year after deportation.

Honours
JK Tallinna Kalev
 Estonian Top Division: 1923
Tallinna JK
 Estonian Top Division: 1926

References

1901 births
1942 deaths
People from the Governorate of Estonia
Estonian footballers
Estonia international footballers
Footballers at the 1924 Summer Olympics
Olympic footballers of Estonia
JK Tallinna Kalev players
Estonian police officers
Estonian people executed by the Soviet Union
People who died in the Gulag
Sportspeople from Paide
Association football midfielders